Elections for the members of the Senate were held on November 8, 1949 in the Philippines.

While President Elpidio Quirino won a full term as President of the Philippines after the death of President Manuel Roxas in 1948, and his running mate, Senator Fernando Lopez won as Vice President, their Liberal Party won all of the contested seats in the Senate.  Despite factions created in the administration party, Quirino won a satisfactory vote from the public.

It was the only time in Philippine history where the duly elected president, vice president and senators all came from the same party, the Liberal Party.

Carlos P. Romulo and Marvin M. Gray, publisher of the Manila Evening News, accuse Quirino in their book The Magsaysay Story (The John Day Company, 1956, updated - with an additional chapter on Magsaysay's death - re-edition by Pocket Books, Special Student Edition, SP-18, December 1957) of widespread fraud and intimidation of the opposition by military action, calling it the "dirty election".

Results
Key:
 ‡ Seats up
 *+Gained by a party from another party
 √ Held by the incumbent
 * Held by the same party with a new senator
^ Vacancy

Per party
The Liberals originally had 19 seats entering the 2nd Congress, but the election of Senator Fernando Lopez to the vice presidency meant that his seat is vacant until 1951, when it was contested in a special election.

See also
Commission on Elections
2nd Congress of the Philippines

References

External links
 The Philippine Presidency Project
 Official website of the Commission on Elections

1949
General election